Sandeep Kumar is an Indian Archer. He won the gold medal at the 2014 Asian Games in Incheon, South Korea in the men's compound archery team event along with Abhishek Verma and Rajat Chauhan. He had been honoured with the Arjuna award in the year 2015.

References

Living people
Indian male archers
Asian Games medalists in archery
Archers at the 2014 Asian Games
Asian Games gold medalists for India
Medalists at the 2014 Asian Games
Place of birth missing (living people)
Year of birth missing (living people)
Recipients of the Arjuna Award